Miogryllus is a genus of crickets in the subfamily Gryllinae ("field crickets"), in the family Gryllidae ("true crickets") and tribe Gryllini. Members of the genus Miogryllus are called striped crickets, also lesser field crickets. There are two North American species of Miogryllus, Miogryllus lineatus, the western striped cricket, and Miogryllus saussurei, the eastern striped cricket.

Species
The genus contains the following species:

Miogryllus amatorius Otte, 2006
Miogryllus beliz Otte & Perez-Gelabert, 2009
Miogryllus bellator Otte & Perez-Gelabert, 2009
Miogryllus bohlsii (Giglio-Tos, 1895)
Miogryllus caparo Otte & Perez-Gelabert, 2009
Miogryllus catacustes Otte & Perez-Gelabert, 2009
Miogryllus convolutus (Johannson, 1763)
Miogryllus ensifer (Scudder, 1896)
Miogryllus ergaticos Otte & Perez-Gelabert, 2009
Miogryllus guanta Otte & Perez-Gelabert, 2009
Miogryllus incertus (Giglio-Tos, 1894)
Miogryllus itaquiensis Orsini & Zefa, 2017
Miogryllus lineatus (Scudder, 1876)
Miogryllus muranyi de Mello & Morselli, 2011
Miogryllus pammelas Otte, 2006
Miogryllus piracicabensis Piza, 1960
Miogryllus pugnans Otte & Perez-Gelabert, 2009
Miogryllus rehni (Randell, 1964)
Miogryllus saussurei (Serville 1838)
Miogryllus scythros Otte, 2006
Miogryllus tobago Otte & Perez-Gelabert, 2009
Miogryllus tucumanensis Giglio-Tos, 1894
Miogryllus verticalis (Serville, 1838)

References

 Field Guide To Grasshoppers, Katydids, And Crickets Of The United States, Capinera, Scott, Walker. 2004. Cornell University Press.
 American Insects: A Handbook of the Insects of America North of Mexico, Ross H. Arnett. 2000. CRC Press.
 Otte, Daniel (1994). Crickets (Grylloidea). Orthoptera Species File 1, 120.

External links
NCBI Taxonomy Browser, Miogryllus

Gryllinae
Orthoptera genera